Journey is the second album by Shimizu Shota, released on March 3, 2010. It was released in two versions: a regular edition (¥3,059) and a limited edition including a DVD (¥3,500).

Track listing
CD:

 Journey
 Forever Love (Shota Shimizu × Miliyah Kato)
 Kimi ga Suki (君が好き)
 Cream
 Starlight
 Sayonara wa Itsumo Soba ni (さよならはいつも側に)
 Kimi ga Ita kara (君がいたから)
 Close to You
 Utsukushiki Hibi yo (美しき日々よ)
 Sakura (桜)
 Days
 Let's Groove (Bonus track)

DVD:

 Sayonara wa Itsumo Soba ni (Music Video)
 Utsukushiki Hibi yo (Music Video)
 Kimi ga Suki (Music Video)
 Family feat. Ken the 390, SHUN & COMA-CHI (Music Video)
 Forever Love (Shimizu Shota x Miliyah Kato) (Music Video)
 Mobile Music Drama "DOR@MO" Utsukushiki Hibi yo 「Minna Tsunagateru」 (みんなつながってる)

Charts
Oricon Sales Chart (Japan)

2010 albums